Bohušovice nad Ohří is a town in Litoměřice District in the Ústí nad Labem Region of the Czech Republic. It has about 2,500 inhabitants.

Administrative parts
The village of Hrdly is an administrative part of Bohušovice nad Ohří.

Geography
It lies in a flat agricultural landscape of the Lower Eger Table. The town proper lies on the left bank of the Ohře River.

History
The first written mention of Bohušovice nad Ohří is from 993, when Duke Boleslaus II donated the village to the Břevnov Monastery. The village often changed hands. In 1384, the Doksany Monastery had built the Church of St. Procopius. From 1436 to 1460 Bohušovice was owned by the town of Litoměřice, then it was acquired by Vilému of Kounice, who sold it to the Kaplíř of Sulejovice family. But after the court process, the village returned to the property of the Doksany Monastery.

During the Thirty Years' War, Bohušovice was repeatedly looted and damaged by Saxons and Swedes. After the partial restoration of the village, it was once again plundered, this time by the Prussians in the Seven Years' War.

The economic development of the village started with the construction of the railway from Prague to Dresden, which was put into operation in 1850. In 1920, Bohušovice was promoted to a town. After it ceased to be a town during the World War II, the status of the town was restored in 1998.

Transport
Bohušovice nad Ohří lies on the regional railway line from Prague to Děčín.

Sights
The landmark of the town is the Church of Saints Procopius and Nicholas. It is a Baroque church of high artistic level from 1716 with an originally Gothic tower.

Other sights are the Empire style Chapel of Saint Anne from the first half of the 19th century, and a stone Empire bridge over the Ohře from 1848.

Gallery

References

External links

Cities and towns in the Czech Republic
Populated places in Litoměřice District